Vertical market software is aimed at addressing the needs of any given business within a discernible vertical market (specific industry or market). While horizontal market software can be useful to a wide array of industries (such as word processors or spreadsheet programs), vertical market software is developed for and customized to a specific industry's needs.

Vertical market software is readily identifiable by the application specific graphical user interface which defines it. One example of vertical market software is point-of-sale software.

See also 
Horizontal market software
Horizontal market
Product software implementation method
Enterprise resource planning
Customer relationship management
Content management system
Supply chain management

Resources 
Microsoft ships first Windows OS for vertical market from InfoWorld
The Limits of Open Source - Vertical Markets Present Special Obstacles

Software by type